Aleksandr Aleksandrovich Korotkov (born 29 March 2000) is a Russian football player who plays for FC Alania Vladikavkaz.

Club career
He made his debut in the Russian Football National League for FC Veles Moscow on 10 July 2021 in a game against FC Yenisey Krasnoyarsk.

References

External links
 
 Profile by Russian Football National League

2000 births
Footballers from Saint Petersburg
Living people
Russian footballers
Association football defenders
FC Zenit Saint Petersburg players
FC Veles Moscow players
Russian First League players
Russian Second League players